= Ntokozo Ngongoma =

South African gospel singer and producer

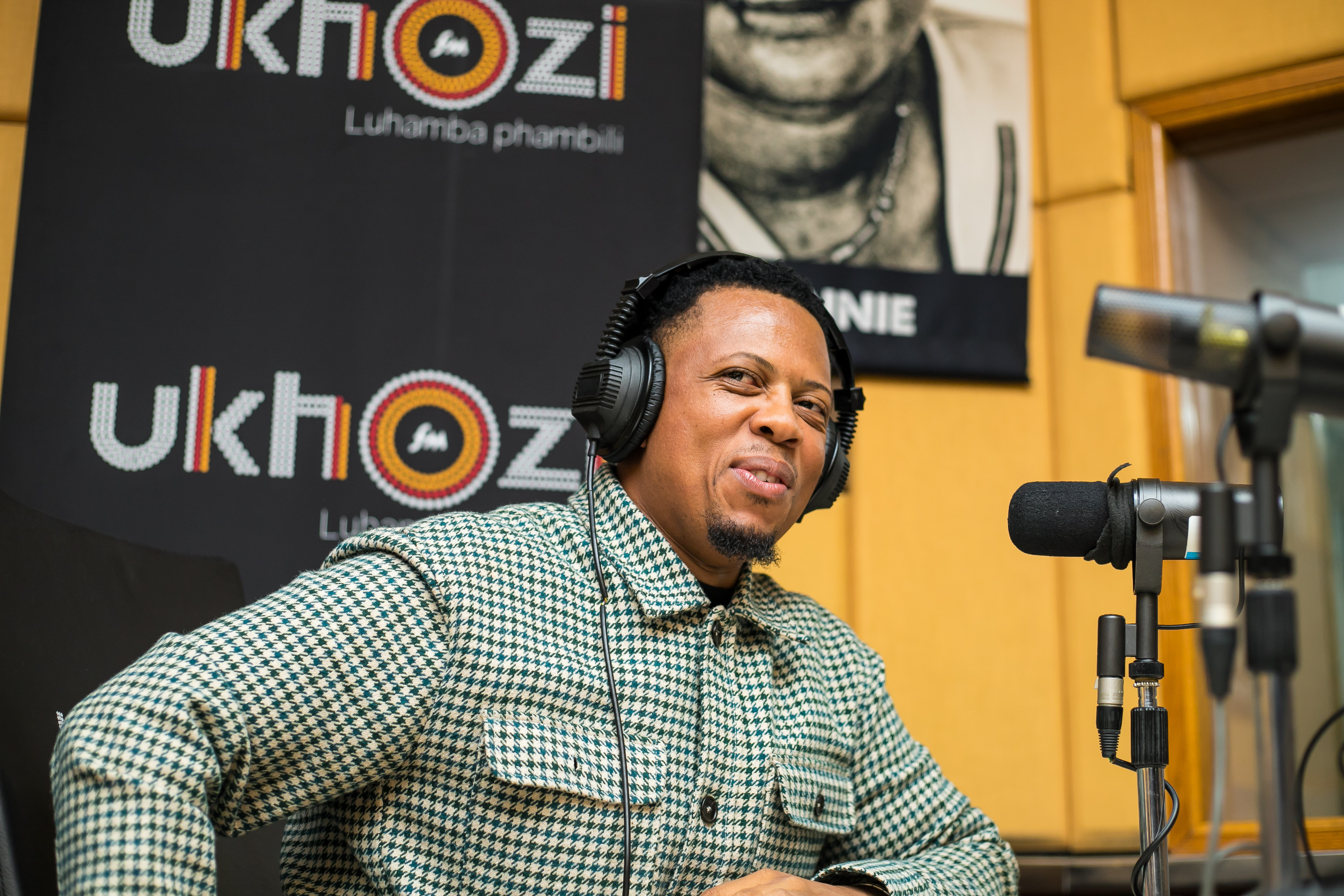
- Ngongoma during an Interview at Ukhozi FM

Background information
- Born: KwaZulu-Natal, South Africa
- Genres: Gospel
- Occupations: Singer, songwriter, musical director, composer, arranger, producer
- Years active: 2010s–present
- Label: Yonder Music
- Website: Official website

Ntokozo Ngongoma is a South African gospel singer-songwriter and music producer who has also worked as a pianist and musical director. He was listed by the South African Broadcasting Corporation (SABC) among the performers for the 16th Crown Gospel Music Awards (2023) and was named as a Best Gospel Song nominee for "Izindlela Zakhe".

== Early life ==
Ntokozo Ngongoma’s early musical development began in childhood, when he taught himself how to play piano, later deciding to pursue formal music studies after completing high school. Beginning in the early 2000s, Ngongoma built his professional career largely behind the scenes, working as a pianist, musical director, conductor, producer, songwriter and arranger.

== Career ==
=== Behind the scenes work and collaborations ===
In 2014, Media Update described Ngongoma as being recognised for musical-director work and for producing/writing/directing South African gospel artists, in the context of a Durban music festival talent-search panel announcement. In a later interview, Ngongoma said he had worked with artists such as Hlengiwe Mhlaba, Avante and the late Sfiso Ncwane as part of his early career in the South African gospel industry.

=== Recordings and releases ===
A live album credited to Ngongoma and the Ethekwini Gospel Choir, Live At The Playhouse, is listed on Apple Music with a release date of 23 June 2017. Ngongoma's single Izindela Zakhe is listed on Apple Music with a release date of 18 September 2020.

In 2023, Ngongoma collaborated with Pastor Mthunzi Namba on a release as part of the "Kingdom Worship Experience" project; in that interview, Ngongoma stated that he recorded "Khayelihle" in 2016 and described "Izindlela Zakhe" (recorded in 2020) as a major breakthrough during the COVID-19 period.

=== Public performances and industry recognition ===
SABC listed Ngongoma among performers for the 16th Crown Gospel Music Awards (2023). A contemporaneous nominees report in the Sunday Independent also listed "Izindlela Zakhe" among the Best Gospel Song nominees for that year.

== Notable works and achievements ==
Among works tied to independent media coverage are the song "Izindlela Zakhe", which featured in Crown Gospel Music Awards nomination reporting, and Ngongoma's work as part of the Kingdom Worship Experience collaboration reported by News24/DRUM. Catalogue listings also show the live album Live At The Playhouse (2017) and the single Izindela Zakhe (2020).

== Awards and recognition ==
Ngongoma was listed by SABC and other South African media as a Best Gospel Song nominee for "Izindlela Zakhe" at the 16th Crown Gospel Music Awards (2023). A 2022 industry post by Downtown Music Publishing Africa referenced Ngongoma as nominated in "Classic of All Time" and "Best Gospel Songwriter" categories for the 15th Crown Gospel Music Awards (as reported in that publication).

== Personal life ==
In October 2025, Ngongoma publicly announced the death of his 13-year-old son, Ziphozenkosi Ngongoma, after a brief illness; South African outlets The Citizen and IOL reported the announcement and subsequent condolences.
